Batala is the eighth largest city in the state of Punjab, India in terms of population after Ludhiana, Amritsar, Jalandhar, Patiala, Bathinda, Mohali and Hoshiarpur. Batala ranks as the second-oldest city after Bathinda. It is a municipal corporation (since 3 March 2019) in Gurdaspur district in the Majha region of the state of Punjab, India. It is located about 32 km from Gurdaspur, the headquarters of the district. It is also a Police District. Batala holds the status of the most populated town of the district with 31% of the total population of district. It is the biggest industrial town in the district. Batala is the centre of the Majha region of Punjab.

Batala is an important place for Sikh devotees. Guru Nanak Dev Ji, the founder of the Sikh religion was married here to Sulakhni, the daughter of Mul Chand Chauna in 1485. Many temples and gurdwaras related to the guru's marriage attract devotees from near and far. Every year celebrations are conducted on the anniversary of Guru Nanak's marriage. The gurudwara name kandh sahib where every year guru nanak marriage anniversary held. This marriage festival called (ਬਾਬੇ ਨਾਨਕ ਦਾ ਵਿਆਹ)  in Punjabi language. There is also a historical gurdwara Satkartarian sahib related to 6th guru of Sikhs Shri Hargobind ji.

Batala is still one of the leading cities in Northern India in manufacturing of C.I Casting and mechanical machinery. It's also an agricultural marketplace and industrial center. Cotton ginning, weaving, sugar refining, and rice milling are some of other industries taking place here.

History 

The city was founded in 1465 CE by Raja his Highness Abhay Partap Singh Bal, a Bhati Rajput of Kapurthala under the suzerainty of Sultan Bahlul Lodi. Later, during the Mughal rule, Akbar gave it in jagir to his foster brother, Shamsher Khan. Batala was a very famous city of the Punjab region, just like Lahore, Jalandhar and other major cities in the 16th century, and it is 109 years older than Amritsar. The whole city was lying within a fort. It had 12 gates as entrances and exit. These gates are still known by their old names, e.g. Sheran Wala Gate, Khajuri Gate, Bhandari Gate, Ohri Gate, Thathiari Gate, Hathi Gate, Pahari Gate, Mori Gate, Kapoori Gate, Achli Gate etc. Some of them still survive although their condition is in need of attention.

Other historic places in Batala are gurdwaras where Guru Nanak stayed during his lifetime. There are also numerous other gurdwaras of significant importance to Sikhs and therefore attract thousands of Sikhs from around the globe.

In British India, Batala was the headquarters of a tehsil in the Gurdaspur district of the Punjab Province. The allocation of the Gurdaspur district during the Partition of India was highly contested because it was in central Punjab and had roughly equal proportion of Muslim and non-Muslim populations. Viceroy Lord Wavell allocated three eastern tehsils of the district (Gurdaspur, Batala and Pathankot) to India, and one western tehsil (Shakargarh) to Pakistan. However, it continued to be contested. The whole district was shown as part of Pakistan in the 'notional partition line' in the Indian Independence Act 1947 and the issue was referred to the Punjab Boundary Commission. The final partition line ('Radcliffe Line') eventually confirmed Wavell's division of the district, with the result that Batala became part of India. For three days, 14–17 August 1947, Batala was regarded as part of Pakistan, then added to Indian territory.

At the time of partition in 1947, Batala had a majority Muslim population. After the partition line was announced, majority population of Muslim left Batala and went to Pakistan and many Hindus and Sikhs were settled here. Then Hindus and Sikhs settled there and Batala now has a Hindu majority which holds more than 56% of city's total population with a large Sikh minority population at 38%.

Politics 
The city is part of the Batala Assembly Constituency.

Demographics 

As per provisional data from the 2011 census, the Batala urban agglomeration had a population of 158,404, out of which males were 83,536 and females were 74,868. The literacy rate was 85.28 per cent.

Villages
Qila Lal Singh

Economy

Minerals 

Foundry sand is found in Dharamkot, near Batala; the deposits are located 6.5 km west of Batala. Exposed on both sides of Batala–Dera Baba Nanak road, the Dharmkot sand is a natural moulding sand, containing about 20% clay. Another deposit which is about 4 metres thick, occurs at about 6 km from Batala on the Batala Qadian road. The sand has a yellowish tinge on the surface, but is reddish brown at a depth of about 1 metre.

The sand deposits are also found at Bhagwanpur about 15 km west of Batala on Dera Baba Nanak Road and about 10 km from Gurdaspur on the Gurdaspur Naushera Road (20 percent clay).

Salt petre occurs in the district at the villages of Thikriwala, Pandori in the tehsils of Gurdaspur and Dhawan, Chataurgarh and Badowal in the tehsil of Batala. It is a source of potassium nitrate which can be used for making crackers and gunpowder, in the match and sugar industries, and as fertilizer.

Landmarks 

Located in Gurdaspur district,  from Amritsar on the Kashmir Grand Trunk road.
One of the older towns in the province of Lahore in earlier times, Batala is home to many monuments of religious and historic importance, such as Hazira Park, Barah Dari, Hakikat Samadh. These monuments are connected with Sikh history and the Mughal period. The city consists of several churches constructed during the British Raj.

Jal Mahal (Baradari) 

The Jal Mahal and the palace of Maharaja Sher Singh were built by the Maharaja (CE 1780–1839). The palace is under the control of the authorities of the local Baring Union Christian College. The administrative offices of the college are housed in it. Jal Mahal is under the control of the Archaeological Survey of India (ASI). Jal Mahal (Baradari) and the palace of Maharaja Sher Singh were connected through a tunnel. According to some senior citizens, Shamsher Khan Tank of Jal Mahal used to be filled with water through the tunnel, which was further connected to a long tunnel (canal) to the Beas, near Kahnuwan. The remnants of the tunnel can be seen near Baring Christian College.

Maharaja Sher Singh used to hold meetings of his courtiers in Jal Mahal. The water reservoir was built by Shamsher Khan while the beautiful Baradari in the centre of the tank was constructed by Maharaja Sher Singh. It has a square room in the centre of a pavilion with a passageway. The entry to the first floor is by a staircase with concave-shaped steps on the north-eastern canal. Jal Mahal has eight doors in the lower part of the building and four in the upper storey. The inner wall contained beautiful art glass carvings and wall paintings. However, major parts of the paintings have been erased or damaged. The roof of the pavilion has also fallen. The Municipal Council provided a tubewell to fill up the tank till the eighties. All sides of the reservoir were lined with Nanakshahi bricks. However, with the passage of time the brick lining has been destroyed. Nowadays, on one side of the tank is located a vridh ashram owned and managed by the Dainik Prarthana Sabha. There also exists Bhadr Kali Mandir and Shivala. The upper portion of Jal Mahal is in a dilapidated condition and the time is not far when this magnificent structure will pass into oblivion.

Gurdwara Kandh Sahib 

Guru Nanak Dev Ji was married here to Bibi Sulakhani Ji. He was engaged to the daughter of Mul Chand Chauna who along with the Brahmin priests insisted on a traditional Hindu marriage while Guru Nanak Dev Ji wanted a simple marriage. Guru Nanak Dev ji was sitting beside a crooked mud wall (kandh) discussing the marriage plans with the Brahmin clergy. It was planned to push the wall on top of the Guru but Guru Nanak Dev ji was warned of the plan by an old woman. Guru Nanak Dev Ji just smiled and said "This wall will not fall for centuries. The will of God shall prevail." The wall is still preserved within the Gurdwara and a celebration is held here every year on the anniversary of Guru Nanak's marriage. At walking distance of two minutes there is Gurudwara Dera sahib, which was house of Mata Sulakhni Ji (bride of Guru Nanak dev ji). An ancient well is situated in Gurudwara dera sahib, it is said that water of well is having special curing powers in itself.

Kali Dwara Mandir  

Another very famous and the most-visited devotional place here is the temple dedicated to Goddess Kali.
It's situated in the heart of city i.e., Chakri Bazar and maximum rush is seen on Tuesdays.
During Navratri time, a lot of people from city and surrounding region visit the temple. People of Batala and outside have true faith on Mata Kali Dwara Mandir.
Many other temples are also situated in Batala City.

Sati Lakshmi Devi Smadh 

Sati Laxmi Devi Smarak is located in the Smadh road of Batala opposite to Hanuman Akahara, The Smadh of Sati Lakshmi devi is there, who was engaged to Veer Hakikat Rai, When Laxmi Devi heard the news of death of her becoming husband, She became Sati (throw herself in fire and burn to death), her age was 10 years at that time, On that place a big public park is made by Local People on the smadhis of Veer Haqiqat Rai and Sati Lakshmi Devi, Reason for the death of Veer Haqiqat Rai is mentioned below|:

Haqiqat Rai Puri was born into a Hindu family, in Sialkot, Punjab, Mughal India with his caste being a Puri Khatri.[6] His father's name was Bagh Mal Rai, a Hindu trader. At the age of 14, Rai was sent to a Maulvi to learn Persian. One day some of his Muslim classmates were making fun of various Hindu deities, ridiculing his religion. In return he asked them how they would feel if anyone insulted Muhammad or Ayesha. For this, his classmates reported this to the Maulvi as it was taken as an insult of Islam.

As a result, he was taken to Lahore (then a provincial capital in the Mughal Empire), where he was given the option to convert to Islam to save his life, but he refused. As a result, he was beheaded at the age of 14, during the governorship of Zakariya Khan. Quasi Abdul Haq, who was responsible for the Fatwa, was also beheaded later by Sardar Dal Singh and Saradar Mana Singh and shown around the city of Batala

Transport 
Batala is an important industrial town famous for the manufacture of machine tools and woolen products. Therefore, it is well connected with the other cities and towns of Punjab by road and railways. Government and private buses are the main source of journey to other cities. Batala has the only government bus depot in the district.

Bus 

Bus Stand Batala is near Gandhi Chownk and people can normally commute to different cities via buses, everyday around 1,000 buses ferry more than 40,000 passengers.

Rail 

Batala railway station (station code BAT) is on the Amritsar–Pathankot line of the Firozpur division of the Northern Railway zone of the Indian Railways. Train to Qadian is another diversion from Batala. Ministry of Railways has accepted in 2010 Budget plan to connect the Batala–Quadian rail link to Jalandhar via Beas Junction. The project would start soon. This project will help connect Batala to high-speed Amritsar–Delhi section and cutting travel time to Jalandhar by 1 hour, with no need to go via Amritsar.

Air 

Hospitals
Batala has a number of hospitals, schools and colleges affiliated to different boards.

Hospitals
 Satsar Hospital, Batala 
 Mahajan Hospital, Batala
 Navtej Humanity Hospital & Club  
 Johal Surgical Hospital
 Civil Hospital, Batala
 Batala Hospital,Dera Road,Shukerpura,Batala

Education
Colleges
Baring Union Christian College (GNDU)
Batala Institute of Medical Science, Sarwali, Dera road, Batala
IK Gujral PTU campus Batala (degree college)
Government Polytechnic college, Batala 
Guru Nanak Dev College
R.R. Bawa DAV College for Girls
Royal Institute of Nursing
S.L. Bawa DAV College
V.M.S. institute of information and technology

Schools
Dr. MRS Bhalla DAV School, Qila mandi, Batala. (PSEB)
Govt. Senior Secondary school (Boys) Near Gurudwara kandh Sahib, Batala. (PSEB)
Akshey sareen's school 
Arya girls Sr. secondary school (PSEB)
Baring School (ICSE) 
BVN Sainik High School 
Cambridge International School, Batala (CBSE)
City young School, ICSE 
Dr. Daulat Ram Bhalla DAV Centenary Public School (CBSE)
Des Raj DAV Senior Secondary School (CBSE)
Evergreen science & sports school, achalsahib (chahalkalan) (PSEB)
F.c. Verma Sr. Secondary School (PSEB)
F.S.M. Silver Creek School (ICSE)
Gems Cambridge International School, Batala
Guru Nanak School
Guru Nanak Khalsa Sr/Sec (Narowal), Batala
Hollyhock High School, Batala 
Kotli Bhan Singh primary school
Methodist sen.sec. school (PSEB)
R D Khosla DAV Model Senior Secondary School (CBSE)
Saheed Baba Deep Singh Modern School, Dhupsari
Salvation Army School and College
St. Francis School (ICSE)
WoodStock Public School, Anarkali Rd, Batala (CBSE)
National Progressive School (PSEB)
Excelsior Public (CBSE)
Shri Guru Nanak Dev Academy Kandila, Batala
The Millennium School, Batala (CBSE)

Notable people 

 Shiv Kumar Batalvi – Poet, Singer
 Mumtaz Mufti – Renowned Pakistani writer, philosopher and psychologist, awarded the high Pakistani civilian award Sitara-e-Imtiaz and Munshi Premchand award.
 Mian Din Muhammad – Maharaja Ranjit Singhs Ambassador to Peshawar, his counsellor and tutor of Prince Sher Singh. Later he became revenue minister of Mahraja Sher Singh. Kucha Din Muhammad is a locality in Batala named after him.
 Mian Ghulam Farid Khan – Extra-assistant Commissioner (Revenue) in British Indian government and Honorary Magistrate of Batala. Awarded title of Khan Bahadur on 1891 by the British government.
 Mian Muhammad Said – Officer of Imperial police. Served as Superintendent of Police Lahore and Inspector-General Kapurthala State. Awarded title of Khan Bahadur on 1923 by the Viceroy and Governor-general. 
 Mian Ahmed Said – Deputy-post master general of Punjab and NWFP. Awarded title of Khan Bahadur on 1946 by the Viceroy and Governor-general.
 Bhupinder Singh Mann – Ex Member of Parliament (Rajya Sabha from 1990 to 1996), nominated by President of India for outstanding contribution to the cause of Indian Farmers.
 Prabhjot Singh – hockey player of Indian Men's Hockey Team.
 Gurpartap Singh Mann – Member of Punjab Public Service Commission (PPSC)
 Surjit Singh Randhawa – hockey player of Indian Men's Hockey Team.
 Dev Anand – He studied at Batala, Dharamshala and Lahore before partition.
Mohini Hameed – Pakistani radio broadcaster, anchor and actress.
Sardar Jassa Singh Ramgarhia - Sikh Misaldar and ruler of Batala during Sikh Misl period.
 Syed Mian Nazar Mohiuddin (1882-1961) - was the Head of an old prestigious family of Batala known as the Mians of Batala. and descended from Syed Fazil ud Din. 
His son Son Badar Mohiuddin (1905-1987) became an elected member of Punjab legislative assembly in the 1930s. Syed Badar Mohiuddin's son and successor Syed Altaf Mohiuddin became an elected member of the Punjab Assembly in Pakistan. 
Syed Nazar Mohiuddin's son Najm Hosain Syed (born 1935) is an eminent poet, critic, playwright and translator of Punjabi Language whose numerous books have been published from Lahore. Some of them have been transcribed into Punjabi script and published in India.

See also 
Qilla Tek Singh
Nahra

References

External links 
Official Website of the Gurdaspur district, Punjab
Batala at Encyclopædia Britannica

Cities and towns in Gurdaspur district